Sanborn is an album by jazz saxophonist David Sanborn that was released by Warner Bros. in 1976. It contains a version of "I Do It for Your Love" by Paul Simon.

Track listing
 "Indio" (Rosalinda de Leon) - 5:35
 "Smile" (Paul Simon, Coleridge-Taylor Perkinson) - 5:24
 "Mamacita" (de Leon) - 4:45
 "Herbs" (Herb Bushler) - 4:29
 "Concrete Boogie" (Hiram Bullock) - 6:42
 "I Do It For Your Love" (Simon) - 2:47
 "Sophisticated Squaw" (Victor Lewis) - 4:47
 "7th Ave." (Lewis) - 5:34

Personnel 
 David Sanborn – alto saxophone, soprano saxophone, flute
 Rosalinda de Leon – keyboards
 Richard Tee – keyboards on "I Do It for Your Love"
 Hiram Bullock – guitar, vocals
 Herb Bushler – bass guitar
 Victor Lewis – drums
 Juma Santos – percussion
 Paul Simon – vocals on "Smile"
 Phoebe Snow – vocals on "Smile"
 Patti Austin – backing vocals
 Lani Groves – backing vocals

Production
 John Court – executive producer 
 Phil Ramone – producer, recording engineer 
 Vicki Fabry – recording assistant 
 Theresa Del Pozzo – production coordinator 
 Sam Shaw – photography, design

References

1976 albums
David Sanborn albums
Albums produced by Phil Ramone
Warner Records albums